Toad Hall is the fictional home of Mr. Toad, a character in the 1908 novel The Wind in the Willows by Kenneth Grahame.

History
On his retirement from the Bank of England in 1908, Grahame returned to Blewbury in Berkshire, the county in which he grew up. In October that year he published The Wind in the Willows, a novel for children featuring an array of anthropomorphic characters, including Rat (a water vole), Mole, Badger and Toad. Toad lives in a house on the edge of the River Bank, Toad Hall. The novel was almost universally condemned by critics, but achieved very considerable sales. It has been in print continuously since its publication and has been adapted for plays, a ballet, films and musicals. Originally published as plain text, it has subsequently been illustrated by a number of notable artists including Paul Bransom, Arthur Rackham and E. H. Shepard.

Description
Grahame's description of Toad Hall is sparse: "a handsome, dignified old house of mellowed red brick, with well-kept lawns reaching down to the water's edge". Its owner is in no doubt as to its merits: Finest house on the whole river,' cried Toad boisterously. 'Or anywhere else, for that matter. The hall has a "very old banqueting-hall" and a "large boat-house". Stables stand to the right of the house, as viewed from the river. An ancient underground passage, unknown to Toad but vouchsafed to Mr Badger by Toad's father, and of critical importance to the novel's denouement, "leads from the river bank ..., right up into the middle of Toad Hall".

Inspirations
A number of houses have been cited as the inspiration for Toad Hall. These include:
 Fawley Court in Buckinghamshire;
 Fowey Hall Hotel in Cornwall;
 Foxwarren Park in Surrey;
 Hardwick House in Oxfordshire;
 Mapledurham House also in Oxfordshire.

Gallery of claimants

Notes

Sources
 

Fictional houses
Culture associated with the River Thames
Fictional buildings and structures originating in literature